Kashtag-e Dastgerd (also Romanized as Kāshtāg-e Dastgerd) is a village in Poshtkuh Rural District, in the Central District of Khash County, Sistan and Baluchestan Province, Iran. At the 2006 census, its population was 40, in 6 families.

References 

Populated places in Khash County